David Finney may refer to:

 D. J. Finney (1917–2018), British statistician
 David Wesley Finney (1839–1916), Lieutenant Governor of Kansas